Taurpis Tula is a Glasgow-based band currently comprising David Keenan, Heather Leigh Murray and Alex Neilson.  Initially a duo of Keenan and Murray (both of whom are listed with the surname "Leigh X" on their debut album), they expanded to a trio in 2005 with the Steel Rods Bruise Butterflies CDR on Chocolate Monk being the first document of this incarnation. They toured Europe in 2007 with The Skaters, in support of two further albums.

Discography
Sparrows LP (2004)
Steel Rods Bruise Butterflies CDR (2006)
Endless Alphabet of Light CDR (2007)
Cadillac Sitting Like A Ton Of Lead LP (2007)

External links 
Bio @ All Tomorrow's Parties December 2006

Scottish rock music groups